Arley is an unincorporated community in Clay County, in the U.S. state of Missouri.

History
A post office called Arley was established in 1893, and remained in operation until 1907. The community was named after Arley Webber, a settler's son.

References

Unincorporated communities in Clay County, Missouri
Unincorporated communities in Missouri